Lusitania was an ancient Roman province corresponding to most of modern Portugal.

Lusitania, Lusitanian, and Lusitanic may also refer to:

Cultures and peoples
Lusitanian language
Lusitanian mythology 
Lusitanians, the original Indo-European inhabitants of Lusitania (Proto-Celt)
Lusitanic, the shared linguistic and cultural traditions of the Portuguese-speaking nations

Places
Kingdom of Northern Lusitania, proposed by Napoleon for the king of Etruria in Northwestern Portugal
New Lusitania, a Portuguese colony in Brazil

Science
Lusitania (alga), a genus of green algae 
 Lusitanian distribution, a disjunct distribution of a species
 HD 45652, a star named Lusitania

Sport
S.C. Lusitânia (basketball), an Azorean basketball team
Lusitânia F.C., Portuguese football club

Other uses
List of ships named Lusitania
Lusitania (album), by Fairweather, 2003
Lusitania, a size of cigar of the Partagás brand
Lusitania, the name of a British Rail Class 40 locomotive

See also
 Lusitano (disambiguation)
 Lusatia, a historical region in Central Europe
 Lusitanian War, between the Lusitanians and Ancient Rome